Monte Torena is a mountain in Lombardy, Italy, located within the Bergamo Alps.

On its south slopes there's the source of the Serio river.

Mountains of the Alps
Mountains of Lombardy